Bredgade 38 is a Neoclassical property in the Frederiksstaden neighborhood of central Copenhagen, Denmark. The building was listed in the Danish registry of protected buildings and places in 1951. Notable former residents include the naval officer Carl Wilhelm Jessen and businessman Emil Vett.

History

18th century
The site was originally part of the gardens of Sophie Amalienborg. It was later part of the garden of the Bernstorff Mansion. Bernstorff's property was listed in the new cadastre of 1756 as No. 71. Ot was marked as No. 287 on Christian Gedde's map of St. Ann's East Quarter. The property now known as Bredgade was later referred to as No. 71 OO 4.

Arctander and the new building

 
The present building on the site was built in 180102 by carpenter and master builder Andreas Hallander. In the new cadastre of 1806, the property was listed as No. 175. It was owned by Hans Nicolai Arctander (1757-1837) at that time. He lived in the building with his wife Agneta Birgitte Brammer and nine children. The eldest daughter Anna Alette Christine Arctander would later marry Andreas Erich Heinrich Ernst, Count von Bernstorff /1791-1834).

One of Arctander's tenants, Carl Wilhelm Jessen, a captain in the Royal Danish Navy,  was among the resident of the building from 1804 to 1808. He would later serve as governor of the Danish West Indies.  Hans Wilhelm v. Warnstedt, who had previously served as director of the Royal Danish Theatre, resided in the building in  1812-1817). The  poet Christian Winther was among the residents in 1828 and again in 1830.

1840
No. 175 was home to a total of 23 residents at the 1845 census. Ferdinand Bauditz (1778-1849), a military officer with rank of Major-General, resided in one of the apartments with his wife and four unmarried children. Carl Ewald (1789-1866), the king's Adjutant general, resided in another apartment with his wife and three unmarried daughters (aged 19-32). The naval officer Christian Zahrtmann (da) resided in the third apartment with his wife and three daughters. They lived there from 1839 to 1853. Andreas Felumb	 (1806-), a master shoemaker, resided in the basement with his wife and four children. 

The painter Frederik Christian Lund resided in the building in the mid 1850s and the lawyer and politician Carl Christian Vilhelm Liebe resided there in 1861-63, 

The teacher  Ludvig Trier (1837-1911) lived in an apartment on the ground floor until 1874.. He prepared Denmark's first female medical doctor Nielsine Nielsen for her later studies.  In her diary, she describes her first meeting with him in the apartment on 22 June 1874 at 5 A:N.:"

This meeting became of crucial significance to my study and my lifehis mother had just passed away but he still occupied the comfortable apartment they had shared in Bredgade. It was in his small study facing the courtyard that he resided. A small room full of books with school desk and wax-cloth sofa, small-barred windows and greenish glass with dusty cactiand an anteroom full of book shelves.

Seligmann
 
The businessman (grosserer) Adolf Seligmann )1839-1912) purchased the property in around 1874. His property was home to 37 residents in six households at the 1885 census. Seligmann resided on the first floor with his wife Viga Seligmann, their six children (aged seven to 16), two male servants, a bonne and two maids. Emil Vett, another businessman, resided on the second floor with his wife Caroline Vett, their five children (aged five to 13) and three maids. Henriette Holm, a widow, resided on the ground floor with her 51-year-old daughter Constance Holm and three maids. Charlotte Bergstrøm	 and Louise Bunken, two unmarried women in their 50s, resided in the garret with two maids. Christian Posgren Pedersen	, a master shoemaker, resided in the basement with his wife 
Caroline Pedersen and the shoemaker Johan Pehrson (employee). Hans Carl Hansen, a building painter (malersvend), resided in the basement with his wifeMarie Hansen.

Seligmann's former company A. Seligmann & Co. was still based in the building in 1910.

Bruun
In 1928, Bredgade 38 was acquired by supreme court attorney H.H. Bruun who from then on ran his law firm from the premises. It was from 1944 continued by his son Jonas Bruun under his own name. It moved after merging with Hjejle Gersted Mogensen under the name Bruun & Hjejle in 2009.

Architecture
Bredgade 38 consists of a three-storey building towards the street, a six -bay perpendicular side wing which extends from the rear side of the building and a three-bay rear wing. The building towards the street is five bays wide. The outer windows on the first and second floor are accented by sandstone frames and the ones on the first floor are topped by triangular pediments. There is a frieze between the three central windows on the first and second floor.

Today
In 2017, COPU acquired the building. It has later been converted into high-end apartments.

References

External links
 Drawings in the Danish National Art Library
 Christian Zartmann
 Apartment
 Source

Listed residential buildings in Copenhagen
Buildings and structures completed in 1802
1892 establishments in Denmark
Andreas Hallander buildings